Palace of the Peacock (1960) is the first novel by Guyanese writer Wilson Harris. It is considered an important early postcolonial novel and a canonical text in Caribbean Literary Studies. The novel is the first in Harris's "Guyana Quartet" of novels, which also include The Far Journey of Oudin (1961), The Whole Armour (1962) and The Secret Ladder (1963).

Synopsis
The novel is set in the sixteenth century and presents the narrative of a group of men from different ethnic backgrounds making their way up a dangerous and turbulent river within the jungles of Guyana. The party is led by a man named Donne, a cruel second-generation European colonialist who was born in Guyana, and who is hunting for a woman called Mariella who has run away from him. Over the course of the journey it becomes apparent that it is not the first time the men have tried to make their way up this river and that last time they attempted to traverse the river they were all drowned. It is suggested that they now exist in a liminal or spectral state between life and death. The events of the narrative are narrated by a first person narrator who is identified simply as "Dreamer" in the opening pages of the novel. Dreamer's presence becomes increasingly oblique as the novel progresses.

Publication
The novel was written in 1959 after Wilson Harris had moved to London from Guyana. The manuscript for the novel was accepted for publication by T. S. Eliot.

Further reading
Maes-Jelinek, Hena 'Numinous Proportions: Wilson Harris's Alternative To All Posts' in Past the Last Post: Theorizing Post-Colonialism and Post-Modernism (Brighton: Harvester Wheatshef, 1991): 47-64
Noxolo, Patricia and Marika Preziuso 'Moving Matter: Language in Caribbean Literature as Translation between Dynamic Forms of Matter' in Interventions 14.1 (2012): 120-135
Shaw, Gregory. 'Wilson Harris's Metamorphoses: Animal and Vegetable Masks in Palace of the Peacock' in Callaloo 18.1 (1995): 158-170
Toliver, Victoria. 'Vodun Iconography in Wilson Harris's Palace of the Peacock' in Callaloo 18.1 (1995): 173 -190

References

1960 novels
Postcolonial novels
1960 debut novels